Luis Castro Lois (born 6 April 2002) is a Spanish footballer who plays for Polvorín FC as a left back.

Club career
Born in Ribadumia, Pontevedra, Galicia, Castro represented ED Arousa SD and Pontevedra CF before joining CD Lugo's youth setup in 2019. On 30 December 2020, before even having appeared for the reserves, he made his first team debut by starting in a 2–1 away win against CA Pulpileño, for the season's Copa del Rey.

Castro made his professional debut on 7 January 2021, coming on as a second-half substitute for Gerard Valentín in a 1–2 away loss against Girona FC, also for the national cup. He made his Segunda División debut on 1 April, replacing Hugo Rama late into a 1–6 away loss against UD Las Palmas.

References

External links

2002 births
Living people
People from O Salnés
Sportspeople from the Province of Pontevedra
Spanish footballers
Footballers from Galicia (Spain)
Association football defenders
Segunda División players
Tercera Federación players
CD Lugo players
Polvorín FC players